Traktor Stadium is a multi-purpose stadium in Minsk, Belarus. It is currently used mostly for football matches and is the home ground of Traktor Minsk.

History
The stadium was built in the 1950s. Its original name was Krasnoye Znamya Stadium, before it was attached to Minsk Tractor Works and renamed to Traktor Stadium in 1976. During Soviet years the stadium was a home ground for Traktor Minsk in Belarusian SSR league as well as Dinamo Minsk reserves in the Soviet Reserves league.

In 1976, the stadium was renovated. During 1978–1980, it became a temporary home stadium for Dinamo Minsk senior team, while Dinamo Stadium was closed for renovation in preparation for the 1980 Summer Olympics football tournament.

In the 1990s, the stadium served as a home for several clubs, including Dinamo-93 Minsk, Ataka Minsk, as well as Dinamo Minsk in 1997 (while Dinamo Stadium was reserved only for international matches due to pitch condition). Second reconstruction started in 1997 and included installation of the fence and plastic seats.

In 2000s the stadium was shared between MTZ-RIPO Minsk and Zvezda-BGU Minsk. Traktor Stadium hosted a 2002 Belarusian Premier League decider match and in 2010–11 Belarusian Cup final. In the late 2000s, MTZ-RIPO Minsk then-owner Vladimir Romanov proposed a major renovation of the stadium and surrounding area, including building of a new modern stadium and an entertainment center, but the plan fell through after businessman's fall out with the club.

Since 2013, the stadium has been serving as a home for Dinamo Minsk once again, while their other ground Dinamo-Yuni Stadium is on a long term renovation.

International use
Over the years the stadium has hosted some of UEFA Cup/UEFA Europa League qualifying rounds as well as UEFA Intertoto Cup home matches by Dinamo Minsk (2004, 2013–2016), MTZ-RIPO Minsk (2005–2009), Neman Grodno (2003) and Shakhtyor Soligorsk (2003). It also hosted occasional home games of Belarus national youth teams.

See also
 FC Partizan Minsk

References

External links
 Stadium profile at Dinamo Minsk website
 Stadium profile at MTZ-RIPO/Partizan Minsk website (archived)

Sports venues built in the Soviet Union
Football venues in Belarus
FC Partizan Minsk
Sport in Minsk
Buildings and structures in Minsk
Multi-purpose stadiums in Belarus
FC Dinamo Minsk
Sports venues completed in 1968
1968 establishments in the Soviet Union